Piz Timun (also known as Pizzo d'Emet) is a mountain of the Oberhalbstein Range, located on the border between Italy and Switzerland. On its eastern side it overlooks the artificial lake Lago di Lei.

See also
List of mountains of Graubünden
List of most isolated mountains of Switzerland

References

External links
 Piz Timun on Hikr

Mountains of the Alps
Alpine three-thousanders
Mountains of Graubünden
Mountains of Lombardy
Italy–Switzerland border
International mountains of Europe
Mountains of Switzerland
Ferrera